Efraim Davidi (born 15 August 1959) is an Israeli former professional footballer that has played in Hapoel Be'er Sheva.

Honours

Club
 Hapoel Beer Sheva

 Premier League:
 Third place (4): 1982/1983, 1987/1988, 1993/1994, 1994/1995
 State Cup:
 Runners-up (1): 1983/1984
 Toto Cup:
 Winners (1): 1988/1989
 Runners-up (1): 1985/1986
 Lillian Cup:
 Winners (1): 1988
 Runners-up (2): 1982, 1983

References

External links
 
 

1959 births
Living people
Israeli footballers
Hapoel Be'er Sheva F.C. players
Hapoel Tzafririm Holon F.C. players
Maccabi Ironi Ashdod F.C. players
Beitar Be'er Sheva F.C. players
Liga Leumit players
Israel international footballers
People from Ness Ziona
Footballers from Beersheba
Israeli people of Iranian-Jewish descent
Sportspeople from Tehran
Association football defenders